The discography of Juli, a German alternative pop band, contains four studio albums, one live album and seventeen singles. The band released their first studio album Es ist Juli after signing to Universal Records in 2004. This was followed by their second album Ein neuer Tag which peaked at number one on the German Albums Chart in October 2006. Juli's third album In Love was released in September 2010 and yielded two singles.

Albums

Studio albums

Live albums

Singles

As featured artist

Music videos

References

Discography
Discographies of German artists
Rock music group discographies
Pop music group discographies